This is a list of songs that reached #1 on the RIAJ Digital Track Chart chart in Japan in 2010. The highest-selling digital singles in Japan are published by Recording Industry Association of Japan. PC downloads and ringtone downloads are not eligible for the chart, only cellphone downloads (Chaku-uta Full) count for the chart.

The chart week runs from Wednesday to Tuesday. The final week of 2009, starting December 29, was merged with the following week (12/30-1/5) due to New Year's celebrations (in a similar manner to Oricon).

Chart history

See also
List of number one Reco-kyō Chart singles 2006–2009

References

Japan
Digital singles of 2010
Recording Industry Association of Japan
2010 in Japanese music